Simone Holtznagel is an Australian fashion model, best known for her appearance in Australia's Next Top Model (cycle 7).

Australia's Next Top Model 
In October 2011, Holtznagel was the last eliminated in Australia's Next Top Model, Cycle 7 in the finale at the Sydney Opera House.

Career
Since appearing on Australia's Next Top Model, Holtznagel has featured in campaigns for brands such as Bras N Things, Playboy and Guess.

In January 2018, Holtznagel was revealed as a celebrity contestant on the fourth season of the Australian version of I'm a Celebrity...Get Me Out of Here!.

References

External links

Year of birth missing (living people)
Living people
Top Model finalists
Australian female models
I'm a Celebrity...Get Me Out of Here! (Australian TV series) participants